Persian calligraphy or Iranian calligraphy, is the calligraphy of the Persian language. It is one of the most revered arts throughout the history of Iran.

History

History of Nasta'liq
After the introduction of Islam in the 7th century, Persians adapted the Arabic alphabet to Persian and developed the contemporary Persian alphabet. The Arabic alphabet has 28 characters. An additional four letters were added by Iranians, which resulted in the 32 letters currently present in the Persian alphabet.

Around one thousand years ago, Ibn Muqlah and his brother created six genres of Iranian calligraphy, namely "Mohaqiq", "Reyhan", "Sols", "Naskh", "Toqi" and "Reqa". These genres were common for four centuries in Persia. In the 7th century (Hijri calendar), Hassan Farsi Kateb combined the "Naskh" and "Reqah" styles and invented a new genre of Persian calligraphy named "Ta'liq". In the 14th century, Mir Ali Tabrizi combined two major scripts of his time, i.e. Naskh and Taliq, and created a new Persian calligraphic style called "Nas’taliq". In the past 500 years Nastaʿlīq (also anglicized as Nastaleeq) has been the predominant style for writing the Perso-Arabic script.

In the 17th century Morteza Gholi Khan Shamlou and Mohammad Shafi Heravi created a new genre called cursive Nastaʿlīq Shekasteh Nastaʿlīq). Almost a century later, Abdol-Majid Taleqani, who was a prominent artist at the time, brought this genre to its highest level. This calligraphic style is based on the same rules as Nas’taliq. However, cursive Nas’taliq has a few significant differences: it provides more flexible movements, and it is slightly more stretched and curved. Yadollah Kaboli is one of the most prominent contemporary calligraphers within this style.

Contemporary Persian calligraphy
In 1950, the Iran's Association of Calligraphers was founded by Hossein Mirkhani, Ali Akbar Kaveh, Ebrahim Bouzari, Hassan Mirkhani and Mehdi Baiani. For an overview of Persian calligraphy's development within Afghanistan, see "Calligraphy during last two centuries in Afghanistan" (1964), by Azizuddin Vakili.

Modernist movement
Zendeh Roudi, Jalil Rasouli, Parviz Tanavoli, and Nima Behnoud use Persian calligraphy and Rumi poetry in dress designing.

Post modernism
Abol Atighetchi uses combination of colored naskh, suluth and kufic style calligraphy with large letters in a single large format acrylic painting for his work presentation and circles in gold leaf or simple color to decorate but in the Nastaligh style many colorful geometrical forms and lines are used to modernize the painting and the same technique is used to modernize the large format birds of bessmel, all drawn with large letters. This style of work can be classified as post-modern.

Genres
Nasta'liq script
Shekasteh Nastaʿlīq (Cursive Nasta'liq)
Naghashi-khat (Painting-Calligraphy combined)

Most notable figures

Mir Ali Tabrizi
Mir Emad
Mírzá ʻAbbás Núrí
Mishkín-Qalam
Gholam Hossein Amirkhani

See also
Calligraphy
Islamic calligraphy
List of Persian calligraphers

References

External links

Ḡolām-Ḥosayn Yūsofī, Calligraphy, Encyclopaedia Iranica, at http://www.iranicaonline.org/articles/calligraphy
Brief history of Persian Calligraphy
About history of Persian Calligraphy and its different styles
Anthology of Iranian Masters of Calligraphy 

 
Islamic calligraphy
Iranian art
Persian art